J Is for Jackson 5 is a compilation of music from The Jackson 5. The album was released under Universal Motown's "Universal Music Family" line, compiling hits suitable for children and their parents.

Track listing
"I Want You Back"
"Zip-a-Dee-Doo-Dah"
"The Love You Save"
"ABC"
"2-4-6-8"
"I'll Be There"
"Little Bitty Pretty One"
"E-Ne-Me-Ne-Mi-Ne-Moe (The Choice Is Yours to Pull)"
"My Little Baby"
"Corner of the Sky"
"Dancing Machine"
"Mama's Pearl"
"I Want You Back" (Karaoke)
"The Love You Save" (Karaoke)
"I'll Be There" (Karaoke)
"Mama's Pearl" (Karaoke)

2010 compilation albums
The Jackson 5 compilation albums
Motown compilation albums